Bunhill may refer to several locations in Islington, London, England:

Bunhill Fields, a former burial ground
Bunhill Row, a street running along the west side of Bunhill Fields
Bunhill, a ward in Islington South and Finsbury (UK Parliament constituency)